Below is an episodic synopsis of Pillow Talk, which consists of 21 episodes and broadcast on MediaCorp Channel 8.

Episodic synopsis

See also
List of programmes broadcast by Mediacorp Channel 8

Pillow
Pillow